Volunteering is the practice of people working on behalf of others without being motivated by financial or material gain.

Volunteer or volunteers may also refer to:

Volunteerism
 Voluntears, Disney cast members who volunteer their time for charitable or community causes
 Loyal Volunteers, a white settler movement in the Conococheague Valley of colonial Pennsylvania sometimes known as the Black Boys Rebellion

Military and paramilitary
 Military volunteer, may refer to either non-conscripts, or to reservists

American and Irish
 Volunteer (Irish republican)
 Volunteer (Ulster loyalist)
 Volunteers of Ireland, a Loyalist American regiment of Irish ancestry 1778–84
 Irish Volunteers
 Irish Volunteers (18th century), formed to support the Irish Patriot Party 1778–85

British
 British Volunteer Corps, a home defence force raised as part of the British anti-invasion preparations of 1803–1805
 Volunteer Force, a home defence force from 1857 to 1908

Religious
 Volunteers of America, a social welfare group

Film and television
 The Volunteer (1917 film), an American silent drama film
 The Volunteer (1944 film), a recruitment short
 Volunteers (1958 film), a Soviet feature film
 Volunteers (1985 film), a comedy starring John Candy and Tom Hanks
 "The Volunteer" (Full House), a 1991 episode of the family sitcom

Books
 The Auschwitz Volunteer: Beyond Bravery, a 2012 book reprinting a report by Witold Pilecki
 The Volunteer: One Man's Mission to Lead an Underground Army Inside Auschwitz and Stop the Holocaust, a 2019 book by Jack Fairweather about Pilecki

Music
 Volunteers (Jefferson Airplane album), 1969
 Volunteer (Sham 69 album), 1988
 Volunteers (Spear of Destiny album), 2001
 Volunteer (Old Crow Medicine Show album), 2018
 The Volunteers (album) (2004), by onelinedrawing
 "Volunteers" (song), by Jefferson Airplane
 "The Volunteer" (1966), a single by Autry Inman

Places
 Volunteer Hotel, a former pub in Sydney, Australia
 Volunteer Island, among the Line Islands of Kiribati
 Volunteer Park, Armadale, a football ground in West Lothian, Scotland
 Volunteer Point, Falkland Islands

United States
 Volunteer, North Carolina, an unincorporated community
 Volunteer Park (Seattle)
 Volunteer State Community College, in Gallatin, Tennessee
 The Volunteer State, nickname for Tennessee

Ships
 Volunteer (yacht), winner of the 1887 America's Cup
 , the name of more than one ship of the British Royal Navy
 , operational replica of a 19th-century canal boat based in Illinois, United States
 , the name of more than one United States Navy ship

Sports
 Volunteer State Athletic Conference, a defunct Tennessee college conference
 Volunteer 500, the original name of the Sharpie 500 NASCAR race
 Tennessee Volunteers, the sports teams of the University of Tennessee

Other uses
 Volunteer (botany), a desirable plant that grows on its own, rather than being planted
 Volunteer (capital punishment), a prisoner who wishes to be sentenced to death

See also
 Voluntarism (disambiguation)
 Voluntary (disambiguation)
 
 The Volunteers (disambiguation)